Lely Sampurno (born 2 December 1935) is an Indonesian sports shooter. She competed in the women's 25 metre pistol event at the 1984 Summer Olympics.

References

External links
 

1935 births
Living people
Indonesian female sport shooters
Olympic shooters of Indonesia
Shooters at the 1984 Summer Olympics
Place of birth missing (living people)
Shooters at the 1962 Asian Games
Shooters at the 1986 Asian Games
Asian Games medalists in shooting
Asian Games silver medalists for Indonesia
Medalists at the 1962 Asian Games
20th-century Indonesian women
21st-century Indonesian women